'Sanjay Dutt: One Man, Many Lives' is a biographical book about Bollywood actor Sanjay Dutt, written by film journalist Ram Kamal Mukherjee in 2019. The book was released by Rupa Publisher.

Awards

References 

Indian biographies